Marie Antoinette Jeannine Vanier (b. 21 August 1929) is a Canadian composer and organist who was born blind.

Vanier was born in the Laval-des-Rapides neighbourhood of Laval, Quebec, to Émile and Alice Laurin Vanier. Her father was an engineer. She began her studies at the Nazareth Institute for the Blind, then earned a Bachelor of Music (1950) and a Licentiate of Music (1952) at the University of Montreal. Among her teachers were Françoise Aubut, Jean Papineau-Couture, Roger Filiatrault, Conrad Letendre, Georges Lindsay, Clermont Pépin, and Jean Vallerand. 

Vanier has received several awards for her compositions and musical performances, including:

Second Prize, Casavat Organ Society Competition (1948)

First Prize, Royal Canadian College of Organists (1952)

Sarah Fischer Concerts Scholarship (1959)

CAMMAC (Canadian Amateur Musicians) Competition (1962)

Vanier has served as the organist at several churches in Canada: St. Paul de la Croix (1952-1974) St. Bernardin de Sienne (1978), St. Léon de Westmount (1979-81), St. Casimir (1983-5), and St. André Apôtre (1989-94). She also taught music at the Nazareth Institute and the University of Montreal. Her manuscripts are archived at the Bibliothèque du Quebec.

In retirement, Vanier copies scores and piano methods in Braille for the Canadian National Institute for the Blind.  She says, "You have to try to help others so as not to worry too much about yourself. Every morning I say a prayer of gratitude.”

Vanier's music is published by Waterloo Music Company and Berandol Music Limited/BMI. Her compositions include:

Cinq Pieces pour Enfants (piano)

Fantasia for Recorder Trio

Salve Regina (chorus and orchestra)

References 

1929 births
Living people
Blind classical musicians
Canadian classical composers
Canadian organists
Canadian women composers
Musicians from Quebec
People from Laval, Quebec